Nikolai Vladimirovich Chebykin (born 1 August 1997, Chita, Zabaykalsky Krai, Russia) is a Russian professional ice hockey forward currently playing for Admiral Vladivostok of the Kontinental Hockey League (KHL). Chebykin was selected in the seventh-round, 182nd overall by the Toronto Maple Leafs in the 2016 NHL Entry Draft.

Playing career
Chebykin played as a youth within the junior program of HC Dynamo Moscow, before making his KHL debut with Dynamo in the 2016–17 season, appearing in 8 games for 1 goal.

Out of contract with Dynamo, Chebykin signed a two-year pact with SKA Saint Petersburg prior to the 2017–18 season. He played in just 3 games with affiliate, SKA-Neva of the VHL, before he was released from his contract on October 20, 2017. He played out the remainder of the season with HC Dinamo Saint Petersburg, rebounding with 18 points in 32 regular season games. He contributed with 12 points in 20 post season games to help Dinamo claim the Petrov Cup.

On May 3, 2018, Chebykin was signed to a two-year KHL contract with Salavat Yulaev Ufa, continuing his development with VHL Affiliate, Toros Neftekamsk, into the 2018–19 season.

Prior to the commencement of the 2022–23 season, Chebykin was traded by Spartak Moscow to his fourth KHL club, Admiral Vladivostok in exchange for Yegor Chezganov on 29 August 2022.

Career statistics

Regular season and playoffs

International

Awards and honors

References

External links
 

1997 births
Living people
Admiral Vladivostok players
Dynamo Balashikha players
HC Dynamo Moscow players
Russian ice hockey forwards
Salavat Yulaev Ufa players
SKA-Neva players
SKA-1946 players
HC Spartak Moscow players
Toronto Maple Leafs draft picks
Toros Neftekamsk players
People from Chita, Zabaykalsky Krai
Sportspeople from Zabaykalsky Krai